Erich Tomek (born 1930) is an Austrian screenwriter, film producer and production manager.

Selected filmography
 Hot Pavements of Cologne (1967)
 Aunt Trude from Buxtehude (1971)
 The Mad Aunts Strike Out (1971)
 Rudi, Behave! (1971)
 The Reverend Turns a Blind Eye (1971)
My Daughter, Your Daughter (1972)
 Crazy – Completely Mad (1973)
 Blue Blooms the Gentian (1973)
 Alpine Glow in Dirndlrock (1974)
 Three Bavarians in Bangkok (1976)
 Three Swedes in Upper Bavaria (1977)
 Popcorn and Ice Cream (1979)
 Cola, Candy, Chocolate (1979)
 Bloody Moon (1981)
 Die Supernasen (1983)
 Sunshine Reggae in Ibiza (1983)
 Hochwürden erbt das Paradies (1993, TV film)
  (2007, TV film)

References

Bibliography 
 Roman Schliesser & Leo Moser. Die Supernase: Karl Spiehs und seine Filme. Ueberreuter, 2006.

External links 
 

1930 births
Living people
Austrian screenwriters
Austrian film producers